Diego Alberto Espinoza Atoche (born 30 January 2001) is a Peruvian footballer who plays as a winger for Peruvian Primera División side Universidad San Martín on loan from Alianza Lima.

Career

Club career
On 5 March 2019, 18-year old Espinoza signed his first professional contract with Alianza Lima. However, he only played for the club's reserve team in the 2019 season, including one game on the bench for the first team in the Peruvian Primera División. Therefore, he was loaned out to Ayacucho FC in 2020, to gain some experience.

He made his Ayacucho- and Peruvian Primera División on 2 February 2020 against Universidad San Martín. Espinoza started on the bench, before replacing Carlos Olascuaga in the 61st minute.

In January 2021, Espinoza was loaned out to Universidad San Martín for the 2021 season. However, he wasn't used at all at San Martín, and on 5 July 2021, he was instead loaned out to Cusco FC, for the rest of the year.

On 2 February 2022, Espinoza returned to Universidad San Martín, this time on a permanent deal.

References

External links
 

Living people
2001 births
Association football wingers
Association football midfielders
Peruvian footballers
Peruvian Primera División players
Club Alianza Lima footballers
Ayacucho FC footballers
Club Deportivo Universidad de San Martín de Porres players
Cusco FC footballers
Footballers from Lima